Hay que bañar al nene is a 1958 Argentine film.

Cast

External links
 

1958 films
1950s Spanish-language films
Argentine black-and-white films
1950s Argentine films